Aracana ornata, the ornate cowfish, is a species of boxfish native to southern Australia. First described by John Edward Gray in 1838, the species has a maximum length of 15 cm. They can be differentiated from their close cousins the striped cowfish by the upright look of the spines near their eyes, and their slightly smaller length. Their body is encased in a rigid box-like carapace composed of large sculptured bony plates; bony ridges with large recurved spines; dorsal and anal fins opposite and far back on the body; bony plates on tail base absent or rudimentary.

Ornate cowfish are sexually dimorphic; males have yellow or blue lines and spots, while females are plain with orange-brown stripes. These fish are rarely kept as pets by aquarium hobbyists, as stress can cause them to release ostracitoxin from their skin, easily killing other fish in a tank.

References

External links
 Fishes of Australia : Aracana ornata

ornate cowfish
Fish described in 1838
Taxa named by John Edward Gray